Alpha Sagittae, formally named Sham , is a single star in the northern constellation of Sagitta. Alpha Sagittae is the Bayer designation, which is latinized from α Sagittae and abbreviated Alpha Sge or α Sge. It is visible to the naked eye as a yellow-hued star with an apparent visual magnitude of +4.38. Despite the name, this is not the brightest star in the constellation – that distinction belongs to Gamma Sagittae. Based upon parallax measurements, Alpha Sagittae is approximately 382 light-years from the Sun. It is moving further away from the Earth with a heliocentric radial velocity of 1.7 km/s.

This is an evolved bright giant with a stellar classification of G1 II. It is 151 million years old with 4 times the mass of the Sun and has expanded to around 21 times the Sun's radius. It is radiating 340 times the Sun's luminosity from its enlarged photosphere at an effective temperature of 5,333 K. There is an X-ray source within  of these coordinates.

The evolutionary state of Alpha Sagittae is unclear.  Its temperature and luminosity place it within the Hertzsprung gap, a region of the H-R diagram where stars more massive than the sun are evolving rapidly away from the main sequence towards becoming red giants.  However, the chemical composition of its surface indicates that it has already experienced the first dredge-up of fusion products that occurs soon after a star reaches the red giant branch.  It also lies within the Cepheid instability strip, but is not a Cepheid variable.  It belongs to a small group of known stars that have been called carbon-deficient red giants and may have experienced binary mass exchanges.

Nomenclature

This star bore the traditional name Sham (or Alsahm), which derives from the Arabic word سهم sahm, meaning "arrow", the name formerly having been applied to the whole constellation. In 2016, the International Astronomical Union organized a Working Group on Star Names (WGSN) to catalogue and standardize proper names for stars. The WGSN approved the name Sham for this star on 12 September 2016 and it is now so included in the List of IAU-approved Star Names.

References

Sagittae, Alpha
Sagitta (constellation)
G-type bright giants
Sham
Sagittae, 05
096757
7479
185758
BD+17 4042